FC Bayern Munich won the domestic double, beating Werder Bremen by five points in Bundesliga, and defeating Eintracht Frankfurt 1–0 in the DFB-Pokal final, thanks to a goal from Claudio Pizarro. The season was in spite of that tainted due to a big defeat to Milan in the UEFA Champions League, losing out 5–2 on aggregate in the Last 16. At the end of the season, Bayern signed German football's wonderkid Lukas Podolski from Köln. This was the club's first season at the Allianz Arena.

Squad

Goalkeepers
  Oliver Kahn
  Michael Rensing
  Bernd Dreher

Defenders
  Willy Sagnol
  Lúcio
  Martín Demichelis
  Andreas Görlitz
  Philipp Lahm
  Valérien Ismaël
  Bixente Lizarazu

Midfielders
  Mehmet Scholl
  Ali Karimi
  Zé Roberto
  Michael Ballack
  Jens Jeremies
  Julio dos Santos
  Hasan Salihamidžić
  Owen Hargreaves
  Bastian Schweinsteiger
  Sebastian Deisler
  Andreas Ottl

Attackers
  Roy Makaay
  Claudio Pizarro
  Roque Santa Cruz
  Paolo Guerrero

Bundesliga

Matches

Top Scorers
  Roy Makaay 17 (2)
  Michael Ballack 14
  Claudio Pizarro 11
  Roque Santa Cruz 4
  Paolo Guerrero 4
  Bastian Schweinsteiger 3
  Mehmet Scholl 3

DFB Pokal

Matches

Notes

References
RSSSF – Germany 2005/06

FC Bayern Munich seasons
Bayern Munich
German football championship-winning seasons